Zarev is a surname. Notable people with the surname include:

 Ivan Zarev (born 1986), Bulgarian volleyball player
 Metodi Zarev
 Tsvetan Zarev (born 1983), Bulgarian footballer
 Roumen Zarev (born 1953),
Bulgarian   
 Vladimir Zarev (born 1947), Bulgarian novelist

Bulgarian-language surnames